This list includes properties and districts listed on the National Register of Historic Places in Camden County, North Carolina. Click the "Map of all coordinates" link to the right to view an online map of all properties and districts with latitude and longitude coordinates in the table below.

Current listings

|}

Former listings

|}

See also

National Register of Historic Places listings in North Carolina
List of National Historic Landmarks in North Carolina

References

Camden County